A Tocsin is an alarm or other signal sounded by a bell or bells. It may refer to:

Cold War
TOCSIN, the codeword attached by the Royal Observer Corps to any reading on the Bomb Power Indicator after a nuclear strike on the United Kingdom during the Cold War
Tocsin Bang, the codeword attached by the Royal Observer Corps to any reading on the AWDREY instrument after a nuclear strike on the United Kingdom during the Cold War
Exercise Tocsin, a name for the nuclear attack simulation performed by the Government of Canada
TOCSIN, a Harvard undergraduate group against nuclear weapons, led by Todd Gitlin

Music
Tocsin (album), a 1984 album by goth rock band Xmal Deutschland
Tocsin (Year of No Light album), a 2013 album by French shoegaze band Year of No Light
the fourth and final movement of the Symphony No. 11 (1957) by Dmitri Shostakovich

Newspapers
The Tocsin, an early Australian socialist newspaper
Tocsin (newspaper), a newspaper from Red Bluff, California; see California Digital Newspaper Collection
Marin County Tocsin, a newspaper from Marin County, California; see California Digital Newspaper Collection
Tehama Tocsin, an early name of the Chico Enterprise-Record newspaper in Tehama, California
Tocsin News , or The Enterprise-Tocsin, a newspaper in Mississippi
 The Tocsin of Liberty, an anti-slavery newspaper from the US Liberty Party; see Alexander Wilkie

Other
Tocsin, Indiana, a small town in the United States
"The Tocsin", a poem by John Pierpont

See also